Delicatula is a genus of fungi in the family Tricholomataceae. It was first described by Swiss mycologist Victor Fayod in 1889. The genus contains two widely distributed species.

See also

List of Agaricales genera
List of Tricholomataceae genera

References

Tricholomataceae
Agaricales genera